Dinei, full name Ednet Luís De Oliveira (born February 14, 1981) is a Brazilian footballer who as of 2009 is a free agent.

External links
 
 

1981 births
Living people
Association football forwards
Brazilian footballers
Mirassol Futebol Clube players
Clube Atlético Sorocaba players
Mogi Mirim Esporte Clube players
América Futebol Clube (RN) players
Daegu FC players
K League 1 players
Brazilian expatriate footballers
Expatriate footballers in South Korea
Brazilian expatriate sportspeople in South Korea